In HTML, div and span tags are elements used to define parts of a document, so that they are identifiable when a unique classification is necessary. Where other HTML elements such as p (paragraph), em (emphasis), and so on, accurately represent the semantics of the content, the additional use of span and div tags leads to better accessibility for readers and easier maintainability for authors. Where no existing HTML element is applicable, span and div can valuably represent parts of a document so that HTML attributes such as class, id, lang, or dir can be applied.

span represents an inline portion of a document, for example words within a sentence. div represents a block-level portion of a document such as a few paragraphs, or an image with its caption. Neither element has any meaning in itself, but they allow semantic attributes (e.g. lang="en-US"), CSS styling (e.g., color and typography), or client-side scripting (e.g., animation, hiding, and augmentation) to be applied.

Examples 

For example, to make a certain part of text inside a paragraph red, span can be used as follows:

History 
The span element was introduced to HTML in the internationalization working group's second draft html-i18n in 1995. However, it was not until HTML 4.01 that it became part of the HTML language, appearing in the HTML 4 W3C Working Draft in 1997.

In 1995, span was introduced to mark up any inline span of text, because 'a generic container is needed to carry the LANG and BIDI attributes in cases where no other element is appropriate.' It still serves that general purpose, although a much richer range of semantic elements have been defined since then, and there are also many more attributes that may need to be applied.

div defines a 'division' of the document, a block-level item that is more distinct from elements above and below it than a span of inline material.

Differences and default behaviour 
There are multiple differences between div and span. The most notable difference is how the elements are displayed. In standard HTML, a div is a block-level element whereas a span is an inline element. The div block visually isolates a section of a document on the page, and may contain other block-level components. The span element contains a piece of information inline with the surrounding content, and may only contain other inline-level components. In practice, the default display of the elements can be changed by the use of Cascading Style Sheets (CSS), although the permitted contents of each element may not be changed. For example, regardless of CSS, a span element may not contain block-level children.

Practical usage 
span and div elements are used purely to imply a logical grouping of enclosed elements.

There are three main reasons to use span and div tags with class or id attributes:

Styling with CSS 

CSS does not just apply to visual styling: when spoken out loud by a voice browser, CSS styling can affect speech-rate, stress, richness and even position within a stereophonic image.

For these reasons, and in support of a more semantic web, attributes attached to elements within HTML should describe their semantic purpose, rather than merely their intended display properties in one particular medium. By the correct use of CSS, such 'warnings' may be rendered in a red, bold font on a screen, but when printed out they may be omitted, as by then it is too late to do anything about them. Perhaps when spoken they should be given extra stress, and a small reduction in speech-rate. The second example is semantically richer markup, rather than merely presentational.

Semantic clarity 
This kind of grouping and labelling of parts of the page content might be introduced purely to make the page more semantically meaningful in general terms. It is impossible to say how the World Wide Web will develop in years and decades to come. Web pages designed today may still be in use when information systems that we cannot yet imagine are trawling, processing, and classifying the web. Even today's search engines such as Google and others use proprietary information processing algorithms of considerable complexity.

For some years, the World Wide Web Consortium (W3C) has been running a major Semantic Web project designed to make the whole web increasingly useful and meaningful to today's and the future's information systems.

The microformats movement is an attempt to build an idea of semantic classes. For example, microformats-aware software might automatically find an element like  and allow for automatic dialing of the telephone number.

Access from code 
Once the HTML or XHTML markup is delivered to a page-visitor's client browser, there is a chance that client-side code will need to navigate the internal structure (or Document Object Model) of the web page. The most common reason for this is that the page is delivered with client-side JavaScript that will produce on-going dynamic behaviour after the page is rendered. For example, if rolling the mouse over a 'Buy now' link is meant to make the price, elsewhere on the page, become emphasized, JavaScript code can do this, but JavaScript needs to identify the price element, wherever it is in the markup. The following markup would suffice: . Another example is the Ajax programming technique, where, for example, clicking a hypertext link may cause JavaScript code to retrieve the text for a new price quotation to display in place of the current one within the page, without re-loading the whole page. When the new text arrives back from the server, the JavaScript must identify the exact region on the page to replace with the new information.

Automatic testing tools also may need to navigate web page markup using span and div elements' class or id attributes. In dynamically generated HTML, this may include the use of page testing tools such as HttpUnit, a member of the xUnit family, and load or stress testing tools such as Apache JMeter when applied to form-driven web sites.

Overuse 
The judicious use of div and span is a vital part of HTML and XHTML markup. However, they are sometimes overused.

Various list structures available in HTML may be preferable to a home-made mixture of div and span elements.

For example, this:
<ul class="menu">
  <li>Main page</li>
  <li>Contents</li>
  <li>Help</li>
</ul>

which produces
  Main page
  Contents
  Help

... is usually preferable instead of this:
<div class="menu">
  <span>Main page</span>
  <span>Contents</span>
  <span>Help</span>
</div>

which produces
  Main page
  Contents
  Help

Other examples of the semantic use of HTML rather than div and span elements include the use of fieldset elements to divide up a web form, the use of legend elements to identify such divisions and the use of label to identify form input elements rather than div, span or table elements used for such purposes.
	
HTML5 introduced several new elements; a few examples include the header, footer, nav and figure elements. The use of semantically appropriate elements provides better structure to HTML documents than span or div.

See also 
 HTML and HTML5
 HTML element
 HTML attribute
 Cascading Style Sheets and Help:Cascading Style Sheets
 CDATA
 ContextObjects in Spans (COinS)
 JavaScript
 Semantic Web

References

External links 
 Grouping elements: the DIV and SPAN elements

HTML tags
HTML